Gunnel may refer to:

 Gunnel (fish), a family of elongated fish
 Gunnel (ship element), also known as "gunwale", the top edge of the side of a boat
 USS Gunnel (SS-253), a Gato-class submarine
 Gunnel Channel, Antarctica
 
People with the given name Gunnel:

 Gunnel André (born 1946), Swedish theologian
 Gunnel Fred (born 1955), Swedish actress
 Gunnel Gummeson (born 1930), Swedish teacher, central figure in a famous case of disappearance
 Gunnel Johansson (1922–2013), Swedish gymnast who competed in the 1948 Summer Olympics
 Gunnel Jonäng (1921–2008), Swedish politician
 Gunnel Lindblom (born 1931), Swedish actress
 Gunnel Linde (1924–2014), Swedish writer
 Gunnel Pettersson (born 1960), Swedish artist
 Gunnel Vallquist (1918–2016), Swedish writer

Swedish feminine given names